Mill Farm Sports Village  is a multi-sport facility located on the outskirts of the town of Wesham in the Borough of Fylde  in Lancashire, England. Facilities include the Mill Farm football stadium, home to the football team AFC Fylde since 2016, and several 3G football and hockey pitches.

History
On 19 January 2008, AFC Fylde announced plans to move from their current ground at Kellamergh Park in the village of Warton to a then unnamed location, and in February 2010 unveiled plans for a new Community Sports Complex in Wrea Green; however, the planning application was rejected by Fylde Council in April 2012.

On 3 September 2013, the club announced that new plans had been drawn up for a £18 million multi-sport development, Mill Farm Sports Village, on the outskirts of Wesham. As well as a 6,000-capacity Football League standard football stadium with supporters' facilities, the development would include community sports pitches, sports science facilities, and commercial opportunities including a supermarket. The planning application for the stadium and associated facilities was accepted by Fylde Borough Council on 4 June 2014.

The Preston architecture company the Frank Whittle Partnership Limited (the FWP group), who have been involved in the successful design and delivery of a number of other football stadiums in Lancashire  was chosen to design the sporting village. The prime developer chosen was Warden Construction Limited, also of Preston. Construction began in March 2015  and was completed by the middle of 2016 . The ground opened on 13 August 2016  for the club's first National League North match of the season against Brackley Town. The final cost of the sports village was approximately £25 million.

Design and facilities
The main structure within Mill Farm Sports Village is the football stadium.

The stadium is designed to hold up to 6,000 spectators in three stands. The main grandstand offers 2,000 seats and hospitality areas, and the east and south stands provide covered terracing.  The stadium is described as "simple yet elegant"; it is decorated almost solely in black and white colours for its outer/inner cladding and combines a smooth, curved roof.

Customer facilities include:
 290-seat sports bar ("Bradley's") featuring over 20 large-screen TVs
 80-seat restaurant with roof terrace
 40-seat cafe
 conference and event facilities across 9 rooms

Other facilities

Other sporting facilities
As well as the football stadium, the Mill Farm Sports Village also contains 3rd generation artificial turf football and hockey pitches for community use, and a sports science centre.

Commercial facilities
Mill Farm Sports Village also contains an Aldi supermarket, Euro Garages petrol station with a Spar, Greggs bakery and KFC fast food restaurant. There are future opportunities for a 60-bed hotel on-site.

Transport
Mill Farm Sports Village is accessible by both public transport and private vehicles

By car
Mill Farm Sports Village is less than 1 mile from Junction 3 of the M55 motorway to the north, which leads to Blackpool to the west and Preston  and the M6 to the east. To the south, the A585 Fleetwood Road forms the Kirkham and Wesham Bypass and connects with the A583 Blackpool Road, a main route between Blackpool and Preston. Access to the sports village is via the A585 and on-site parking is available.

Public transport
Mill Farm Sports Village is served by regular bus and train services.

The closest bus stop is on the A585 approximately a 5 minute walk from the centre of the sports village.  The Stagecoach number 61 service operates every 30 minutes providing connections through Blackpool – Kirkham – Preston and return.

The closest railway station is Kirkham and Wesham, approximately half a mile away. The station is operated 
by Northern and is serviced by the Preston-Blackpool North and Preston-Blackpool South lines, with up to six services per hour in each direction. If walking to the sports village is undesirable, private hire vehicles can be booked from the station.

Prizes and honours
In 2017, the project team behind the Mill Farm Sports Village, composed of representatives from Warden Construction, Frank Whittle Partnership, Mill Farm Ventures and AFC Fylde, PWA Planning, Partington and Associates, Petit Singleton Associates, Preston City Council and Fylde Borough Council, was a regional winner in Local Authority Building Control North West Awards.  The judges praised the winners for their: “innovative and creative solutions and building control professionalism that leads to safe, sustainable and high quality construction projects.”

Criticism
Not long after its opening in 2016, Mill Hill Sports Village was criticised by fans and community groups for failing to provide sufficient on-site car parking, and creating traffic problems for the surrounding roads. Following visits from its planning inspectors in 2018, the Fylde Council ruled that Mill Farm's parking facilities and AFC Fylde's traffic management plans were "inadequate".

References

External links
Association Football Club Fylde
Bradley's Sports Bar
FWP Group - Architects - Preston

AFC Fylde
Football venues in England
Sports venues in Lancashire